The Invasion is the fifth studio album by Nigerian duo P-Square. It was released on 29 July 2011  by Square Records. The album features guest appearances from Tiwa Savage, Naeto C, Waje, May D, Eva Alordiah, Muna, Akon and Rick Ross.

Promotion 
The duo promoted and celebrated the album by putting together a concert called "The Invasion Concert",  which was held at the Expo Hall of Eko Hotel in Lagos on 30 July 2011. It featured additional performances from May D, Lynxxx, Eva Alordiah, Muna, 9ice, Ikechuwku, and Bovi.

Composition

Musical style 
The Invasion is a well-rounded multifaceted album  that is composed of R&B, reggae, hip hop, europop and contemporary highlife sounds. "Beautiful Onyinye" and "Forever" are R&B records that cater to R&B lovers, while "Player" and "Jeje" cater to europop lovers. "She's Hot" and "Me and My Brother" are reggae ridims that explore the depths of the reggae music genre. "Shake It Down Low" caters to hip hop lovers who are fans of lyrical content and mesmerizing beats.

Lyrical themes 
The album primarily focuses on love, wealth, success, and nightlife. In "Beautiful Onyinye", "Forever" and "She's Hot", P-Square expressed the love, affection and emotional outburst they share with their significant other. In "Chop My Money" and "Me and My Brother", the duo talked about their vast wealth and the blessings that have been bestowed upon them. "Shake It Down Low" and "Do as I Do" celebrate and explore the feelings and excitement of nightlife.

Critical reception 

The Invasion was met with mixed reviews from music critics. Many critics felt the album was recycled and lacked originality. Others praised its lyrical content, sound, composure and depth. The album was reviewed by Mix Rhythm, 360 Nobs, Leadership newspaper and Naijaura. The latter of the four assigned a score of 8.5 out of 10, while the former gave the album 3.5 stars out of 5, adding, " it was well packaged in terms of graphics, nice photo shots, lyrics and a captivating album art cover". 360 Nobs gave the album an overall score of 6.1 out of 10, stating that "the invasion is not yet complete". Leadership newspaper gave a rating of 9 out of 10.

Accolades

Track listing

Personnel 
Peter Okoye – main artist
Paul Okoye – main artist
Tiwatope Savage – featured artist
Naetochukwu Chikwe – featured artist
Munachi Abii – featured artist
Eva Alordiah – featured artist
Akinmayokun Awodumila – featured artist
Jude Engees Okoye – video director
Fliptyce – record producer

Release history

References

External links 
Official P-Square website

2011 albums
P-Square albums
Igbo-language albums
Albums produced by Fliptyce